Events from the year 1869 in China.

Incumbents
 Tongzhi Emperor (9th year)
 Regent: Empress Dowager Cixi

Events 
 Miao Rebellion (1854–73)
 Dungan Revolt (1862–77)
 Panthay Rebellion
 Tongzhi Restoration

Births 
 Chan Siu-bak, revolutionary figure and associate of Sun Yat-sen